Cloud 9 (Abigail "Abby" Boylen) is a fictional character, a teenage superheroine appearing in American comic books published by Marvel Comics.

Publication history

Cloud 9 was created by writer Dan Slott and artist Stefano Caselli. She first appears in Avengers: The Initiative #1 (June 2007). She continued to appear in that series until the end of its publication, through issue #35 (May 2010).

She is also one of the protagonists of the 2011 six-issue limited series Fear Itself: Youth in Revolt.

Fictional character biography
Abby first demonstrates her powers while flying on a cloud in Evanston, Illinois. She is spotted by the Initiative program and was recruited into it by War Machine, who informs her that if she wants to continue flying, she needs a license. Once at the base, Abby is revealed to be very shy. Self-conscious about her body, she compares it to the other girls' bodies there whom she feels look like Vogue magazine models. 

During a uniform exchange, Abby accidentally enters the boys' showers and is found by fellow new hero MVP. He takes a liking to her and watches as she trains. However, when the training with another new hero, Armory, produces a mishap. MVP is shot by one of Armory's blasts when he tries to protect Abby from harm. Armory was grounded from being a superhero and expelled out of the base. 

Abby is one of the cadets sent on an emergency mission to protect the President from an assassination attempt by HYDRA. It is revealed that she is the top marksman among the Initiative cadets, and she shoots down a HYDRA fighter with a pulse rifle. She becomes distressed when she realizes the HYDRA pilot perished in the explosion. Her drill instructor Gauntlet emphasizes this. Later, in a fight with the group Warbound, she tries to kill her opponent Elloe Kaifi. She is talked out of her actions.

She has stated that she has no intention of superhuman heroics. As she puts it, "I'm only here because I want to fly. Man, this blows."

During the "Killed In Action" story arc, Abby learns that the Initiative had secretly made clones of MVP, and that one of them, who dubs himself KIA, conducts a rampage. Along with a group of fellow Initiative members, she travels to the Van Patrick home, attempting to convince the first MVP clone to download his memories into a device that will transmit them into KIA's brain, essentially reprogramming KIA, but possibly leaving the first clone mindless. Cloud 9 manages to distract KIA by playing on the latent memories of the original MVP and kissing him, allowing her to fill his lungs with her vapor. The MVP clone, rather than wipe his own mind, instead places the helmet on KIA, leaving him an empty shell. Abby and the clone decide to start things over, with Abby acknowledging that the clone is not the MVP she knew.

When Cloud 9 completed her Initiative training, she was assigned to Freedom Force, the Montana team. She is then seen in action alongside Challenger, Think Tank, Equinox, and Spinner. When Equinox is revealed to be a Skrull infiltrator, it is Cloud 9 who kills him.

Initiative instructor Tigra expresses concerns about Cloud 9 having developed a detached attitude towards killing in the line of duty after graduating to active service. Believing that Cloud 9 is merely bottling up her emotions rather than dealing with them, Tigra worries about the psychological trauma that may result if Cloud 9 is forced to confront those feelings.

During the Dark Reign storyline, Norman Osborn orders Freedom Force to attack the Heavy Hitters after they secede from the Initiative. Cloud 9 is ordered to assassinate Night Thrasher, but she misses on purpose. She lies, defending that she honestly missed, Taskmaster realizes she is lying and places her on probation. She joins Hardball to battle the demon Nightmare after he possesses Trauma. Nightmare plagues Abby with visions of undead people with bullet wounds to the head. She fights them and yells at Trauma to fight off his possession. Trauma hears her but Nightmare knocks her out. Following the events of the Siege storyline, Cloud 9 assists a depowered Komodo in capturing Baron Von Blitzschlag.

After Steve Rogers replaces Norman Osborn, Rogers offers her the opportunity to become a trainer at Avengers Academy. She declines when he tells her that it is optional and that the Superhuman Registration Act has been abolished. She destroys her superhero registration card and removes her costume as she flies away, freed from the Act's requirements.

During the Fear Itself storyline, Cloud 9 refuses to attend a meeting held by Prodigy regarding magical hammers that have crashed to Earth. However, when Thor Girl is apprehended and accosted by men outside her holding cell, Cloud 9 arrives to rescue her and subdues the men. After defeating Quicksand, who was on a murder spree, they join in the battle in Las Vegas against Juggernaut (who has been transformed into Kuurth: Breaker of Stone) and rescue civilians.

Cloud 9 later appears amongst the heroes allied with Jeremy Briggs. During a confrontation with the students of the Avengers Academy, she expresses contentment with her new job and expresses that she has no desire to act as a hero herself.

During the Secret Empire storyline, Cloud 9 appears as a member of the Underground when Hydra took over the United States.

Powers and abilities
Abigail has the ability to create an unidentified cloud-like gas form on which she and others can fly. She can also use this gas in an offensive manner, by filling an opponent's lungs with it.

Cloud 9 is one of the better marksmen in the Initiative. War Machine states she had the highest cadet score on the shooting range.

In other media

Video games
 Cloud 9 appears in Lego Marvel's Avengers, voiced by Laura Bailey.

References

External links
 Cloud9 at Marvel.com
 Cloud 9 at Marvel Wiki
 Cloud 9 at Comic Vine

Characters created by Dan Slott
Comics characters introduced in 2007
Fictional characters from Illinois
Marvel Comics female superheroes
Marvel Comics mutates
Marvel Comics superheroes